Raceair Designs LLC is an American aircraft manufacturer based in Gilbert, South Carolina, founded by designer Ed Fisher. The company was formerly located in Mayville, New York and Warren, Ohio. The company specializes in the design and manufacture of ultralight aircraft in the form of plans and kits for amateur construction and complete ready-to-fly aircraft under the US FAR 103 Ultralight Vehicles rules.

The company only offered plans and kits for a short while and then closed down operations in the late 1990s. Its Raceair Skylite and Raceair LiL Bitts designs are also produced by Wings Of Freedom of Hubbard, Ohio. Raceair Designs is now back in operations.

Aircraft

References

External links

Defunct aircraft manufacturers of the United States
Ultralight aircraft
Homebuilt aircraft